Edundja is a settlement in the Ohangwena Region of northern Namibia.

Effects of flood 
It is closer to Angola and this cause the flood during the rainy season as the water flows from the rivers in Angola and it brings some positive and negative effects to the villagers. People can benefit as they catch barble fish and sell them to get something to help them to meet their daily needs. It has some impacts on them as it will destruct their daily activities, it will be hard for the people to get to the clinic and go to other places such as Oshikango.School kids won’t be able to go to school and their cross the water during cold mornings which leads to them to drop out of school.

Infrastructure
The village has reasonably well-developed infrastructure with access to potable water and electricity, although the access roads are not tarred. There are a clinic, a church, and two schools, The schools are ''Edundja Primary School and Edundja Junior Secondary School. There is also Edundja ELCIN Church.

RDP Youth
In response to threatening behavior by Mines and Energy Minister Erkki Nghimtina in Edundja, younger members of the Rally for Democracy and Progress (RDP) demanded that Nghimtina be fired from his position.

People from Edundja

Edundja is home village to the Erkki Nghimtina, Namibian Minister of Works and Transport, and former NamPower director Leaky Hangala.

References

Populated places in the Ohangwena Region